Chortkov (also Chortkov, Tshortkov, Czortkow) is a Hasidic dynasty that originated in Chortkiv, present-day Ukraine. The town was part of the Tarnopol Voivodeship of the Second Polish Republic until September 1939. The town itself was founded in 1522 by Polish King Sigismund I the Old. The dynasty had a large following before the Second World War, but most of its adherents were murdered in the Holocaust.

Chortkov is one of the branches of the Ruzhiner dynasty, together with the Bohush, Boyan, Husiatyn, Sadigura, Kapishnitz, Vasloi, and Shtefanesht dynasties.

Chortkov dynasty history

Rav Duvid Moshe Friedman

The first Rebbe of Chortkov was Rabbi Duvid Moshe Friedman (1828–1903), son of Rabbi Yisroel Friedman of Ruzhyn. He was born in 1828 on the festival of Shavuos. His first wife was the daughter of Rabbi Aaron Twerski of Chernobyl. His second wife was his first cousin, a daughter of his brother Rabbi Shalom Yosef Friedman of Sadigura. In 1865, 14 years after his father's death, he settled in Chortkov forming his own community there. His followers were one of the largest Hasidic groups in Galicia, numbering in the thousands. He led an ascetic life, secluding and preoccupying himself with study and prayer day and night. Although he preferred to detach himself from world affairs and distance himself from communal disputes, he was nevertheless considered a major leader of Central European Jewry. To this instance, he agreed to meet with Theodor Herzl who had sent him a personal letter hoping to garner his support for the Zionist Movement, although the meeting never materialised. His oldest son, Reb Nuchem Mordechai, died aged 21 in 1880. He died on Hoshana Rabbah, 1903, and was succeeded by his second son, Reb Yisroel. His teachings have been published in Divrei Dovid, Beis Yisroel and Knesset Yisroel.

Rav Yisroel Friedman
Rabbi Dovid Moshe's son was Rabbi Yisroel Friedman. Rabbi Yisroel ran his Chasidic court with the concept of Hod ShebaTiferes ("Majesty in Glory"; in kabalistic terms). He died in 1934. After Rabbi Yisroel, his sons, Rabbi Nochum Mordechai Friedman and Rabbi Dov Ber Friedman, served as Rebbes. Rabbi Dov Ber died in 1936. Rabbi Nochum fled to the British Mandate of Palestine in 1939, and died in Jerusalem in 1946. His son Rabbi Shlomo Friedman led the Chortkover Hasidim until his death in Tel Aviv in 1959.

Chortkov today
Among the current leaders of the Chortkover Hasidim are Rabbi Yisroel Friedman of Manchester, England, and Rabbi Dov Ber Friedman of Antwerp, Belgium. Both are grandsons of the Chortkover Rebbe Dov Ber, but have refused the title of Chortkover Rebbe. In addition to the Chortkover communities in Manchester and Antwerp, there is also one in Jerusalem, and one in Safed (Tzefas).

The Chortkov Manchester UK community are building a new synagogue to be completed in 2020 which will be a new world centre for Chortkov. The building has unique beauty, and replicates the original Chortkov dynasty synagogue, originally designed and built by the first Rebbe Dovid Moishe of Chortkov in 1876. There is a difference in size between the two as the original one seated 12,000 people

The building will stand as a memory to the six million Jews murdered in the Holocaust, and to reinstate one of the thousands of synagogues and yeshivas destroyed by the Nazis in World War II.

Lineage of the Chortkov dynasty

Historic photographs of Synagogue

See also
History of the Jews in Poland
History of the Jews in Galicia (Central Europe)
History of the Jews in Ukraine

References 

Hasidic dynasties
Jewish Galician (Eastern Europe) history
Judaism in Antwerp
Ruzhin (Hasidic dynasty)